Crothers may refer to:

People
Austin Lane Crothers (1860–1912), United States political figure
Bill Crothers (born 1940), Canadian athlete
Charles C. Crothers (1857–1897), American politician and lawyer
Connie Crothers (born 1940), United States musician
Daniel J. Crothers (born 1957), United States judge in North Dakota
Deanne Crothers, Canadian politician
Derrick Crothers (born 1942), Irish professor and political figure
Doug Crothers (1859–1907), United States athlete
George Crothers (1909–1982), Irish athlete
George E. Crothers (1870–1957), United States judge and philanthropist
Graham Crothers (born 1949), Irish athlete
Harold Marion Crothers (born 1887), United States university professor in South Dakota
Joel Crothers (1941–1985), United States actor
Rachel Crothers (1878–1958), United States playwright and theater director
Samuel Crothers (1783–1855), Presbyterian minister, writer, outspoken antislavery advocate
Samuel McChord Crothers (1857–1927), United States clergyman and essayist
Scatman Crothers (1910–1986), United States actor and musician
Shane Crothers, (born 1973), Australian athlete
Thomas Wilson Crothers (1850–1921), Canadian political figure
Trevor Crothers (f. 1990–2000s), Australian political figure
Whitney Crothers Dilley, American professor of comparative literature and cinema studies
Bronson Crothers, American pediatric neurologist

Places
Crothers Woods, natural area in Toronto, Ontario, Canada

See also
Carruthers (disambiguation)
Carothers
Crowther
Crowthers